Ken Rosewall and Fred Stolle were the defending champions but lost in the quarterfinals to Ilie Năstase and Ion Ţiriac.

John Newcombe and Tony Roche won in the final 4–6, 6–1, 3–6, 6–4, 6–4 against Roy Emerson and Rod Laver.

Seeds

Draw

Finals

Top half

Section 1

Section 2

Section 3

Section 4

Bottom half

Section 5

Section 6

Section 7

Section 8

References

External links
1969 French Open – Men's draws and results at the International Tennis Federation

Men's Doubles
French Open by year – Men's doubles